Writing the Land is a Canadian documentary television series, which premiered in 2021 on CBC Television. Created by Primitive Entertainment and directed by Stephanie Weimar, the four-episode series profiles twelve Canadian writers and their relationship with the landscapes and communities that inspire and inform their writing.

The series received two Canadian Screen Award nominations at the 10th Canadian Screen Awards in 2022, for Best Biography or Arts Documentary Program or Series and Best Direction in a Documentary Series (Weimar).

Episodes

References

2021 Canadian television series debuts
2020s Canadian documentary television series
CBC Television original programming